The Hound of the Baskervilles is a 1921 British silent mystery film directed by Maurice Elvey and starring Eille Norwood, Catina Campbell and Rex McDougall. It is based on the 1902 Sherlock Holmes novel The Hound of the Baskervilles by Arthur Conan Doyle. It was made by Stoll Pictures, Britain's largest film company at the time. It was the first British film adaptation of the famous novel.

Plot
According to a local legend, Sir Henry Baskerville is slated to become the next in his family line to fall victim to a ghostly hound.

Cast
 Eille Norwood as Sherlock Holmes 
 Catina Campbell as Beryl Ducerne Stapleton 
 Rex McDougall as Sir Henry Baskerville 
 Lewis Gilbert as Roger Stapleton Baskerville 
 Hubert Willis as Dr. Watson 
 Allan Jeayes as Dr. James Mortimer 
 Fred Raynham as Barrymore, the Butler 
  Miss Walker as Mrs. Barrymore
  Madame d'Esterre as Mrs. Hudson
 Robert Vallis as Selden

Production
Following the fifteen part The Adventures of Sherlock Holmes this was the first full-length film starring Eille Norwood as Holmes and Hubert Willis as Dr. Watson. It was the second film version of The Hound of the Baskervilles, following the 1914 German silent film Der Hund von Baskerville. Sometimes erroneously claimed to have filmed on Dartmoor, the film was actually shot near the village of Thursley.

Release
The film was released in the United Kingdom on 8 August 1921 and didn't arrive in the United States for another 14 months, by which time the characters of Mr. and Mrs. Barrymore were renamed "Osborne". This was presumably done to avoid confusion with John Barrymore who starred in the film Sherlock Holmes, which was released the same year in the United States.

Critical reception
Allmovie noted that the film sticks closely to the original story, but "doesn't even come close to the definitive 1939 talkie starring Basil Rathbone and Nigel Bruce -- for one thing, there are far too many title cards -- but it still has its moments, mostly involving moody shots of the moors."

Sir Arthur Conan Doyle himself enjoyed the film saying "Mr. Ellie Norwood, whose wonderful personification of Holmes has amazed me. On seeing him in The Hound of the Baskervilles I thought I had never seen anything more masterly."

See also
 Sherlock Holmes (Stoll film series)

References

External links
 
 
 

Films based on The Hound of the Baskervilles
1921 films
British silent feature films
British mystery films
1920s English-language films
Films directed by Maurice Elvey
British black-and-white films
Sherlock Holmes films
Stoll Pictures films
1921 mystery films
1920s British films
Silent mystery films
Silent thriller films